The 1996 Suwon Samsung Bluewings season was Suwon Samsung Bluewings's first season in the K-League in Republic of Korea. Suwon Samsung Bluewings is competing in K-League, League Cup and Korean FA Cup.

Squad

Backroom Staff

Coaching Staff
Head Coach:  Kim Ho
Coach:  Cho Kwang-Rae
Trainer:  Choi Kang-Hee

Scout
 Jung Kyu-Poong

Honours

Club

Individual
K-League Rookie of the Year:  Park Kun-Ha
K-League Best XI:  Yoon Sung-Hyo,  Badea
Korean FA Cup Top Scorer:  Denis (4 goals)

References

External links
 Suwon Bluewings Official website

Suwon Samsung Bluewings seasons
Suwon Samsung Bluewings